Frank Ricardo Ruíz Uceda (born 30 November 1966, in Ica) is a former Peruvian footballer.

Club career
Ruíz played for most of his career with Alianza Lima in the Primera Division Peruana. He also had a spell with Veria in the Greek Super League.

References

1966 births
Living people
People from Ica, Peru
Association football defenders
Peruvian footballers
Unión Huaral footballers
Club Alianza Lima footballers
Veria F.C. players
Deportivo Municipal footballers
Peruvian expatriate footballers
Expatriate footballers in Greece